Bell Glacier is a glacier draining northward into Maury Bay immediately eastward of Blair Glacier. It was mapped by G.D. Blodgett (1955) from aerial photographs taken by U.S. Navy Operation Highjump (1946–47), and named by the Advisory Committee on Antarctic Names for Thomas G. Bell, boatswain on the sloop Peacock during the United States Exploring Expedition (1838–42) under Lieutenant Charles Wilkes.

See also
 List of glaciers in the Antarctic
 Glaciology

References
 

Glaciers of Wilkes Land